Control Data Corporation (CDC) was a mainframe and supercomputer firm. CDC was one of the nine major United States computer companies through most of the 1960s; the others were IBM, Burroughs Corporation, DEC, NCR, General Electric, Honeywell, RCA, and UNIVAC. CDC was well-known and highly regarded throughout the industry at the time. For most of the 1960s, Seymour Cray worked at CDC and developed a series of machines that were the fastest computers in the world by far, until Cray left the company to found Cray Research (CRI) in the 1970s. After several years of losses in the early 1980s, in 1988 CDC started to leave the computer manufacturing business and sell the related parts of the company, a process that was completed in 1992 with the creation of Control Data Systems, Inc. The remaining businesses of CDC currently operate as Ceridian.

Background and origins: World War II–1957 
During World War II the U.S. Navy had built up a classified team of engineers to build codebreaking machinery for both Japanese and German electro-mechanical ciphers. A number of these were produced by a team dedicated to the task working in the Washington, D.C., area. With the post-war wind-down of military spending, the Navy grew increasingly worried that this team would break up and scatter into various companies, and it started looking for ways to keep the code-breaking team together.

Eventually they found their solution: John Parker, the owner of a Chase Aircraft affiliate named Northwestern Aeronautical Corporation located in St. Paul, Minnesota, was about to lose all his contracts due to the ending of the war. The Navy never told Parker exactly what the team did, since it would have taken too long to get top secret clearance. Instead they simply said the team was important, and they would be very happy if he hired them all. Parker was obviously wary, but after several meetings with increasingly high-ranking Naval officers it became apparent that whatever it was, they were serious, and he eventually agreed to give this team a home in his military glider factory.

The result was Engineering Research Associates (ERA). Formed in 1946, this contract engineering company worked on a number of seemingly unrelated projects in the early 1950s. Among these was the ERA Atlas, an early military stored program computer, the basis of the Univac 1101, which was followed by the 1102, and then the 36-bit ERA 1103 (UNIVAC 1103).  The Atlas was built for the Navy, which intended to use it in their non-secret code-breaking centers. In the early 1950s a minor political debate broke out in Congress about the Navy essentially "owning" ERA, and the ensuing debates and legal wrangling left the company drained of both capital and spirit. In 1952, Parker sold ERA to Remington Rand.

Although Rand kept the ERA team together and developing new products, it was most interested in ERA's magnetic drum memory systems. Rand soon merged with Sperry Corporation to become Sperry Rand. In the process of merging the companies, the ERA division was folded into Sperry's UNIVAC division. At first this did not cause too many changes at ERA, since the company was used primarily to provide engineering talent to support a variety of projects. However, one major project was moved from UNIVAC to ERA, the UNIVAC II project, which led to lengthy delays and upsets to nearly everyone involved.

Since the Sperry "big company" mentality encroached on the decision-making powers of the ERA employees, a number left Sperry to form the Control Data Corp. in Sept 1957, setting up shop in an old warehouse across the river from Sperry's St. Paul laboratory, in Minneapolis at 501 Park Avenue. Of the members forming CDC, William Norris was the unanimous choice to become the chief executive officer of the new company. Seymour Cray soon became the chief designer, though at the time of CDC's formation he was still in the process of completing a prototype for the Naval Tactical Data System (NTDS), and he did not leave Sperry to join CDC until it was complete. The M-460 was Seymour's first transistor computer, though the power supply rectifiers were still tubes.

Early designs and Cray's big plan 
CDC started business by selling subsystems, mostly drum memory systems, to other companies. Cray joined the next year, and he immediately built a small transistor-based 6-bit machine known as the "CDC Little Character" to test his ideas on large-system design and transistor-based machines. "Little Character" was a great success.

In 1959, CDC released a 48-bit transistorized version of their re-design of the 1103 re-design  under the name CDC 1604;  the first machine was delivered to the U.S. Navy in 1960 at the Naval Postgraduate School in Monterey, California. Legend has it that the 1604 designation was chosen by adding CDC's first street address (501 Park Avenue) to Cray's former project, the ERA-Univac 1103.

A 12-bit cut-down version was also released as the CDC 160A in 1960, often considered among the first minicomputers. The 160A was particularly notable as it was built as a standard office desk, which was unusual packaging for that era. New versions of the basic 1604 architecture were rebuilt into the CDC 3000 series, which sold through the early and mid-1960s.

Cray immediately turned to the design of a machine that would be the fastest (or in the terminology of the day, largest) machine in the world, setting the goal at 50 times the speed of the 1604. This required radical changes in design, and as the project "dragged on" — it had gone on for about four years by then — the management got increasingly upset and it demanded greater oversight. Cray in turn demanded (in 1962) to have his own remote lab, saying that otherwise, he would quit. Norris agreed, and Cray and his team moved to Cray's home town, Chippewa Falls, Wisconsin. Not even Bill Norris, the founder and president of CDC, could visit Cray's laboratory without an invitation.

Peripherals business 
In the early 1960s, the corporation moved to the Highland Park neighborhood of St. Paul where Norris lived. Through this period, Norris became increasingly worried that CDC had to develop a "critical mass" to compete with IBM. To do this, he started an aggressive program of buying up various companies to round out CDC's peripheral lineup. In general, they tried to offer a product to compete with any of IBM's, but running 10% faster and costing 10% less. This was not always easy to achieve.

One of its first peripherals was a tape transport, which led to some internal wrangling as the Peripherals Equipment Division attempted to find a reasonable way to charge other divisions of the company for supplying the devices. If the division simply "gave" them away at cost as part of a system purchase, they would never have a real budget of their own. Instead, a plan was established in which it would share profits with the divisions selling its peripherals, a plan eventually used throughout the company.

The tape transport was followed by the 405 Card Reader and the 415 Card Punch, followed by a series of tape drives and drum printers, all of which were designed in-house. The printer business was initially supported by Holley Carburetor in the Rochester, Michigan suburb outside of Detroit. They later formalized this by creating a jointly held company, Holley Computer Products. Holley later sold its stake back to CDC, the remainder becoming the Rochester Division.

Train printers and band printers in Rochester were developed in a joint venture with NCR and ICL, with CDC holding controlling interest.  This joint venture was known as Computer Peripherals, Inc. (CPI). In the early 80s, it was merged with dot matrix computer printer manufacturer Centronics.

Norris was particularly interested in breaking out of the punched card–based workflow, where IBM held a stranglehold. He eventually decided to buy Rabinow Engineering, one of the pioneers of optical character recognition (OCR) systems. The idea was to bypass the entire punched card stage by having the operators simply type onto normal paper pages with an OCR-friendly typewriter font, and then submit those pages to the computer. Since a typewritten page contains much more information than a punched card (which has essentially one line of text from a page), this would offer savings all around. This seemingly simple task turned out to be much harder than anyone expected, and while CDC became a major player in the early days of OCR systems, OCR has remained a niche product to this day. Rabinow's plant in Rockville, MD was closed in 1976, and CDC left the business.

With the continued delays on the OCR project, it became clear that punched cards were not going to go away any time soon, and CDC had to address this as quickly as possible. Although the 405 remained in production, it was an expensive machine to build. So another purchase was made, Bridge Engineering, which offered a line of lower-cost as well as higher-speed card punches.  All card-handling products were moved to what became the Valley Forge Division after Bridge moved to a new factory, with the tape transports to follow. Later, the Valley Forge and Rochester divisions were spun off to form a new joint company with National Cash Register (later NCR Corporation), Computer Peripherals Inc (CPI), to share development and production costs across the two companies. ICL later joined the effort. Eventually the Rochester Division was sold to Centronics in 1982.

Another side effect of Norris's attempts to diversify was the creation of a number of service bureaus that ran jobs on behalf of smaller companies that could not afford to buy computers. This was never very profitable, and in 1965, several managers suggested that the unprofitable centers be closed in a cost-cutting measure. Nevertheless, Norris was so convinced of the idea that he refused to accept this, and ordered an across-the-board "belt tightening" instead.

Control Data Institute 
Control Data created an international technical/computer vocational school from the mid-1960s to the late 1980s. By the late 1970s there were sixty-nine learning centers worldwide, serving 18,000 students.

CDC 6600: defining supercomputing 

Meanwhile, at the new Chippewa Falls lab, Seymour Cray, Jim Thornton, and Dean Roush put together a team of 34 engineers, which continued work on the new computer design. One of the ways they hoped to improve the CDC 1604 was to use better transistors, and Cray used the new silicon transistors using the planar process, developed by Fairchild Semiconductor. These were much faster than the germanium transistors in the 1604, without the drawbacks of the older mesa silicon transistors. The speed of light restriction forced a more compact design with refrigeration designed by Dean Roush. In 1964, the resulting computer was released onto the market as the CDC 6600, out-performing everything on the market by roughly ten times. When it sold over 100 units at $8 million ($ million in  dollars) each; it was considered a supercomputer.

The 6600 had a 100ns, transistor-based CPU (Central Processing Unit) with multiple asynchronous functional units, using 10 logical, external I/O processors to off-load many common tasks and core memory. That way, the CPU could devote all of its time and circuitry to processing actual data, while the other controllers dealt with the mundane tasks like punching cards and running disk drives. Using late-model compilers, the machine attained a standard mathematical operations rate of 500 kiloFLOPS, but handcrafted assembly managed to deliver approximately 1 megaFLOPS. A simpler, albeit much slower and less expensive version, implemented using a more traditional serial processor design rather than the 6600's parallel functional units, was released as the CDC 6400, and a two-processor version of the 6400 is called the CDC 6500.

A FORTRAN compiler, known as MNF (Minnesota FORTRAN), was developed by Lawrence A. Liddiard and E. James Mundstock at the University of Minnesota for the 6600.

After the delivery of the 6600 IBM took notice of this new company. In 1965 IBM started an effort to build a machine that would be faster than the 6600, the ACS-1. Two hundred people were gathered on the U.S. West Coast to work on the project, away from corporate prodding, in an attempt to mirror Cray's off-site lab. The project produced interesting computer architecture and technology, but it was not compatible with IBM's hugely successful System/360 line of computers. The engineers were directed to make it 360-compatible, but that compromised its performance. The ACS was canceled in 1969, without ever being produced for customers. Many of the engineers left the company, leading to a brain-drain in IBM's high-performance departments.

In the meantime, IBM announced a new System/360 model, the Model 92, which would be just as fast as CDC's 6600. Although this machine did not exist, sales of the 6600 dropped drastically while people waited for the release of the mythical Model 92. Norris did not take this tactic, dubbed as fear, uncertainty and doubt (FUD), lying down, and in an extensive antitrust lawsuit launched against IBM a year later, he eventually won a settlement valued at $80 million. As part of the settlement, he picked up IBM's subsidiary, Service Bureau Corporation (SBC), which ran computer processing for other corporations on its own computers. SBC fitted nicely into CDC's existing service bureau offerings.

During the designing of the 6600, CDC had set up Project SPIN to supply the system with a high speed hard disk memory system. At the time it was unclear if disks would replace magnetic memory drums, or whether fixed or removable disks would become the more prevalent. SPIN explored all of these approaches, and eventually delivered a 28" diameter fixed disk and a smaller multi-platter 14" removable disk-pack system. Over time, the hard disk business pioneered in SPIN became a major product line.

CDC 7600 and 8600 

In the same month it won its lawsuit against IBM, CDC announced its new computer, the CDC 7600 (previously referred to as the 6800 within CDC). This machine's hardware clock speed was almost four times that of the 6600 (36 MHz vs. 10 MHz), with a 27.5 ns clock cycle, and it offered considerably more than four times the total throughput, with much of the speed increase coming from extensive use of pipelining.

The 7600 did not sell well because it was introduced during the 1969 downturn in the U.S. national economy. Its complexity had led to poor reliability. The machine was not totally compatible with the 6000-series and required a completely different operating system, which like most new OSs, was primitive. The 7600 project paid for itself, but damaged CDC's reputation. The 7600 memory had a split primary- and secondary-memory which required user management but was more than fast enough to make it the fastest uniprocessor from 1969 to 1976. A few dozen 7600s were the computers of choice at supercomputer centers around the  world.

Cray then turned to the design of the CDC 8600. This design included four 7600-like processors in a single, smaller case. The smaller size and shorter signal paths allowed the 8600 to run at much higher clock speeds which, together with faster memory, provided most of the performance gains. The 8600, however, belonged to the "old school" in terms of its physical construction, and it used individual components soldered to circuit boards. The design was so compact that cooling the CPU modules proved effectively impossible, and access for maintenance difficult. An abundance of hot-running solder joints ensured that the machines did not work reliably; Cray recognized that a re-design was needed.

The STAR and the Cyber 

In addition to the redesign of the 8600, CDC had another project called the CDC STAR-100 under way, led by Cray's former collaborator on the 6600/7600, Jim Thornton. Unlike the 8600's "four computers in one box" solution to the speed problem, the STAR was a new design using a unit that we know today as the vector processor. By highly pipelining mathematical instructions with purpose-built instructions and hardware, mathematical processing is dramatically improved in a machine that was otherwise slower than a 7600. Although the particular set of problems it would be best at solving was limited compared to the general-purpose 7600, it was for solving exactly these problems that customers would buy CDC machines.

Since these two projects competed for limited funds during the late 1960s, Norris felt that the company could not support simultaneous development of the STAR and a complete redesign of the 8600. Therefore, Cray left CDC to form the Cray Research company in 1972. Norris remained, however, a staunch supporter of Cray, and invested money into Cray's new company. In 1974 CDC released the STAR, designated as the Cyber 203. It turned out to have "real world" performance that was considerably worse than expected. STAR's chief designer, Jim Thornton, then left CDC to form the Network Systems Corporation.

In 1975, a STAR-100 was placed into service in a Control Data service center which was considered the first supercomputer in a data center.  Founder William C. Norris presided at the podium for the press conference announcing the new service.  Publicity was a key factor in making the announcement a success by coordinating the event with Guinness; thus, establishing the Star-100 as "The most powerful and fastest computer" which was published in the Guinness Book of World Records.  The late Duane Andrews, Public Relations, was responsible for coordinating this event.  Andrews successfully attracted many influential editors including the research editor at Business Week who chronicled this publicity release "... as the most exciting public event he attended in 20 years". Sharing the podium were William C. Norris, Boyd Jones V.P. and S. Steve Adkins, Data Center Manager. It was extremely rare for Bill Norris to take the podium being a very private individual.  Also, during the lunch at a local country club, Norris signed a huge stack of certificates attesting to the record which were printed by the Star 100 on printer paper produced in our Lincoln, Nebraska plant.  The paper included a half-tone photo of the Star 100.  The main customers of the STAR-100 data center were oil companies running oil reservoir simulations.  Most notably was the simulation controlled from a terminal in Texas which solved oil extraction simulations for oil fields in Kuwait.  A front page Wall Street Journal news article resulted in acquiring a new user,  Allis-Chalmers, for simulation of a damaged hydroelectric turbine in a Norwegian mountain hydropower plant.

A variety of systems based on the basic 6600/7600 architecture were repackaged in different price/performance categories of the CDC Cyber, which became CDC's main product line in the 1970s. An updated version of the STAR architecture, the Cyber 205, had considerably better performance than the original. By this time, however, Cray's own designs, like the Cray-1, were using the same basic design techniques as the STAR, but were computing much faster.  The Star 100 was able to process vectors up to 64K (65536) elements, versus 64 elements for the Cray-1, but the Star 100 took much longer for initiating the operation so the Cray-1 outperformed with short vectors.

Sales of the STAR were weak, but Control Data Corp. produced a successor system, the Cyber 200/205, that gave Cray Research some competition. CDC also embarked on a number of special projects for its clients, who produced an even smaller number of black project computers. The CDC Advanced Flexible Processor (AFP), also known as CYBER PLUS, was one such machine.

Another design direction was the "Cyber 80" project, which was aimed at release in 1980. This machine could run old 6600-style programs, and also had a completely new 64-bit architecture.  The concept behind Cyber 80 was that current 6000-series users would migrate to these machines with relative ease.  The design and debugging of these machines went on past 1980, and the machines were eventually released under other names.

CDC was also attempting to diversify its revenue from hardware into services and this included its promotion of the PLATO computer-aided learning system, which ran on Cyber hardware and incorporated many early computer interface innovations including bit-mapped touchscreen terminals.

Magnetic Peripherals Inc. 

Meanwhile, several very large Japanese manufacturing firms were entering the market. The supercomputer market was too small to support more than a handful of companies, so CDC started looking for other markets. One of these was the hard disk drive (HDD) market.

Magnetic Peripherals Inc., later Imprimis Technology, was originally a joint venture with Honeywell formed in 1975 to manufacture HDDs for both companies. CII-Honeywell Bull later purchased a 3 percent interest in MPI from Honeywell. Sperry became a partner in 1983 with 17 percent, making the ownership split CDC (67%) and Honeywell (17%). MPI was a captive supplier to its parents. It sold on an OEM basis only to them, while CDC sold MPI product to third parties under its brand name.

It became a major player in the HDD market. It was the worldwide leader in 14-inch disk drive technology in the OEM marketplace in the late 1970s and early 1980s especially with its SMD (Storage Module Device) and CMD (Cartridge Module Drive), with its plant at Brynmawr in the South Wales valleys running 24/7 production. The Magnetic Peripherals division in Brynmawr had produced 1 million disks and 3 million magnetic tapes by October 1979. CDC was an early developer of the eight-inch drive technology with products from its MPI Oklahoma City Operation. Its CDC Wren series drives were particularly popular with high end users, although it was behind the capacity growth and performance curves of numerous startups such as Micropolis, Atasi, Maxtor, and Quantum. CDC also co-developed the now universal Advanced Technology Attachment (ATA) interface with Compaq and Western Digital, which was aimed at lowering the cost of adding low-performance drives.

CDC founded a separate division called Rigidyne in Simi Valley, California, to develop 3.5-inch drives using technology from the Wren series. These were marketed by CDC as the "Swift" series, and were among the first high-performance 3.5-inch drives on the market at their introduction in 1987.

In September 1988, CDC merged Rigidyne and MPI into the umbrella subsidiary of Imprimis Technology. The next year, Seagate Technology purchased Imprimis for $250 million in cash, 10.7 million in Seagate stock and a $50 million promissory note.

Investments
Control Data held interests in other companies including computer research company Arbitron, Commercial Credit Corporation and Ticketron.

Commercial Credit Corporation 
In 1968, Commercial Credit Corporation was the target of a hostile takeover by Loews Inc. Loews had acquired nearly 10% of CCC, which it intended to break up on acquisition. To avoid the takeover, CCC forged a deal with CDC lending them the money to purchase control in CCC instead, and "That is how a computer company came to own a fleet of fishing boats in the Chesapeake Bay." By the 1980s, Control Data entered an unstable period, which resulted in the company liquidating many of their assets. In 1986, Sandy Weill convinced the Control Data management to spin off their Commercial Credit subsidiary to prevent the company's potential liquidation.  Over a period of years, Weill used Commercial Credit to build an empire that became Citigroup. In 1999, Commercial Credit was renamed CitiFinancial, and in 2011, the full-service network of US CitiFinancial branches were renamed OneMain Financial.

Ticketron

In 1969, Control Data acquired 51% of Ticketron for $3.9 million from Cemp Investments. In 1970, Ticketron became the sole computerized ticketing provider in the United States. In 1973, Control Data increased the size of its investment.

Ticketron also provided ticketing terminals and back-end infrastructure for parimutuel betting, and provided similar services for a number of US lotteries, including those in New York, Illinois, Pennsylvania, Delaware, Washington and Maryland.

By the mid 1980s, Ticketron was CDC's most profitable business with revenue of $120 million and CDC, which was loss-making at the time, considered selling the business. In 1990 the majority of Ticketron's assets and business, with the exception of a small antitrust carve-out for Broadway's "Telecharge" business-unit, were bought by The Carlyle Group who sold it the following year to rival Ticketmaster.

ETA Systems, wind-down and sale of assets 
CDC decided to fight for the high-performance niche, but Norris considered that the company had become moribund and unable to quickly design competitive machines. In 1983 he set up a spinoff company, ETA Systems, whose design goal was a machine processing data at 10 GFLOPs, about 40 times the speed of the Cray-1. The design never fully matured, and it was unable to reach its goals. Nevertheless, the product was one of the fastest computers on the market, and 7 liquid nitrogen-cooled and 27 smaller air cooled versions of the computers were sold during the next few years. They used the new CMOS chips, which produced much less heat. The effort ended after half-hearted attempts to sell ETA Systems. In 1989, most of the employees of ETA Systems were laid off, and the remaining ones were folded into CDC.

Despite having valuable technology, CDC still suffered huge losses in 1985 ($567 million) and 1986 while attempting to reorganize. As a result, in 1987 it sold its PathLab Laboratory Information System to 3M.  While CDC was still making computers, it was decided that hardware manufacturing was no longer as profitable as it used to be, and so in 1988 it was decided to leave the industry, bit by bit. The first division to go was Imprimis. After that CDC sold other assets such as VTC (a chip maker that specialized in mass-storage circuitry and was closely linked with MPI), and non-computer-related assets like Ticketron. Finally, in 1992, the computer hardware and service businesses were spun out as Control Data Systems, Inc. (CDS). In 1999, CDS was bought out by Syntegra, a subsidiary of the BT Group, and merged into BT's Global Services organization.

CDC's Energy Management Division was one of its most successful business units, providing control systems solutions that managed as much as 25% of all electricity on the planet. In 1988 or 1989, this division was renamed Empros and was later sold to Siemens as CDC broke apart.  In June of 1998, CDC sold its last software group ICEM Technologies, makers of ICEM DDN and ICEM Surf, to PTC for $40.6m.

Finally, after the CDS spinout, all that was left of CDC was its services business, and it became known as the Ceridian Corporation. Ceridian continues as a successful outsourced IT company focusing on human resources. In 1997 General Dynamics acquired the Computing Devices International Division of Ceridian. Computing Devices, headquartered in Bloomington, Minnesota, was a defense electronics and systems integration business, originally Control Data's Government Systems Division.

Timeline of systems releases 
 CDC 1604 et al – 1604, 1604-A, 1604-B, 1604-C, 924 (a "cut down" 1604 sibling) * CDC 160 series – 160, 160A (160-A), 160G (160-G) * CDC 3000 series – 3100, 3200, 3300, 3400, 3500, 3600, 3800  * CDC 6000 series – 6200, 6400, 6500, 6700 * CDC 6600 * CDC 7600 * CDC CYBER – 17, 18, 71, 72, 73, 74, 76, 170, 171, 172, 173, 174, 175, 176, 203, 205, Omega/480, 700 * CDC STAR-100

1957 – Founding
1959 – 1604
1960 – 1604-B
1961 – 160
1962 – 924 (a 24-bit 1604)
1963 – 160A (160-A), 1604-A, 3400, 6600
1964 – 160G (160-G), 3100, 3200, 3600, 6400
1965 – 1604-C, 1700, 3300, 3500, 8050, 8090
1966 – 3800, 6200, 6500, Station 6000
1968 – 7600
1969 – 6700
1970 – STAR-100
1971 – Cyber 71, Cyber 72, Cyber 73, Cyber 74, Cyber 76
1972 – 5600, 8600
1973 – Cyber 170, Cyber 172, Cyber 173, Cyber 174, Cyber 175, Cyber 17
1976 – Cyber 18
1977 – Cyber 171, Cyber 176, Omega/480
1979 – Cyber 203, Cyber 720, Cyber 730, Cyber 740, Cyber 750, Cyber 760
1980 – Cyber 205
1982 – Cyber 815, Cyber 825, Cyber 835, Cyber 845, Cyber 855, Cyber 865, Cyber 875
1983 – ETA10
1984 – Cyber 810, Cyber 830, Cyber 840, Cyber 850, Cyber 860, Cyber 990, CyberPlus
1987 – Cyber 910, Cyber 930, Cyber 995
1988 – Cyber 960
1989 – Cyber 920, Cyber 2000

Note: The 8xx & 9xx Cyber models, introduced beginning in 1982,  formed the 64-bit Cyber 180 series, and their Peripheral Processors (PPs) were 16-bit.  The 180 series had virtual memory capability, using CDC's NOS/VE operating system.The more complete nomenclature for these was 180/xxx, although at times the shorter form (e.g. Cyber 990) was used.

Peripheral Systems Group
Control Data Corporation's Peripheral Systems Group was both a hardware and a software development unit that functioned in the 1970s and 1980s.

Their services including development and marketing of IBM-oriented (operating) systems software. One of the Peripheral Systems Group's software products was named CUPID, "Control Data's Program for Unlike Data Set Concatenation." Its focus was for customers of IBM's MVS operating system, and the intended audience was systems programmers. The product's General Information and Reference Manual included SysGen-like options and information about internal
user-accessible control blocks.

Film and science fiction references
 Mars Needs Women (1967) – a CDC 3400 is used for radio communication and to direct the actions of the military as they intercept the Martian spaceships.
 2001 A Space Odyssey (1968) – The HAL-9000 computer is a CDC computer.  The 9000 series was an extrapolation of the CDC 6000 and 7000 series.  The original release of the film quite clearly showed the CDC logo.
 Colossus: The Forbin Project (1970) – The title sequences to this film include tape drives and other early CDC equipment.
 Search (1972) – Control Data Equipment was used in the "Probe Control" command center for both the television series and its pilot PROBE; the end credits list "Computer Equipment provided by Control Data Corporation".
 The Mad Bomber (1973) – The police department has a CDC 3100 that they use to profile the bomber.
 The Adolescence of P-1 (1977), by Thomas Ryan – Control Data computers were very enticing to young P-1.
 The New Avengers – In episode 2-10 (#23) ("Complex", 1977) Purdey uses a CDC card reader.
 Mi-Sex – Computer Games: 1979 pop music video. The band enters the computer room in the Control Data North Sydney building and proceeds to play with CDC equipment.
 Tron (1982) – In the wide screen version of the film, when Flynn and Lora sneak into Encom, a CDC 7600 is visible in the background, alongside a Cray-1. This scene was shot at the Lawrence Livermore National Laboratory.
 WarGames (1983) – Just before David and Jennifer meet with Jim and Melvin, several Control Data disk packs are visible in the background.
 Die Hard (1988) – The computer room shot up by one of the terrorists contained a number of working Cyber 180 computers and a mock-up of an ETA-10 supercomputer, along with a number of other peripheral devices, all provided by CDC Demonstration Services/Benchmark Lab. This equipment was requested on short notice after another computer manufacturer backed out at the last minute. Paul Derby, manager of the Benchmark Lab, arranged to send two van-loads of equipment to Hollywood for the shoot, accompanied by Jerry Sterns of the Benchmark Lab who supervised the equipment while it was on the set. After the machines were returned to Minnesota, they were inspected and tested, and as each machine was sold, a notation was made in the corporate records that the machine had appeared in the film.
 They Live (1988), by John Carpenter – As Roddy Piper is trying on his new "sunglasses" that allow him to see the world as it is, he looks at an advertisement for Control Data Corporation and sees the word OBEY. The film's credits include "special thanks" to CDC.

References

Further reading 
Lundstrom, David. A Few Good Men from Univac. Cambridge, Massachusetts: MIT Press, 1987. .
Misa, Thomas J., ed. Building the Control Data Legacy: The Career of Robert M. Price. Minneapolis: Charles Babbage Institute, 2012 
Murray, Charles J. The Supermen: The Story of Seymour Cray and the Technical Wizards behind the Supercomputer. New York: John Wiley, 1997. .
Price, Robert M. The Eye for Innovation: Recognizing Possibilities and Managing the Creative Enterprise. New Haven: Yale University Press, 2005 
Thornton, J. E. Design of a Computer: The Control Data 6600. Glenview, Ill.: Scott, Foresman, 1970
Worthy, James C. William C. Norris: Portrait of a Maverick. Ballinger Pub Co., May 1987.

External links 

Control Data Corporation Records at the Charles Babbage Institute, University of Minnesota, Minneapolis; CDC records donated by Ceridian Corporation in 1991; finding guide contains historical timeline, product timeline, acquisitions list, and joint venture list.
Oral history interview with William Norris discusses ERA years, acquisition of ERA by Remington Rand, the Univac File computer, work as head of the Univac Division, and the formation of CDC. Charles Babbage Institute, University of Minnesota, Minneapolis.
Oral history interview with Willis K. Drake Discusses Remington-Rand, the Eckert-Mauchly Computer Company, ERA, and formation of Control Data Corporation. Charles Babbage Institute, University of Minnesota, Minneapolis.
Organized discussion moderated by Neil R. Lincoln with eighteen Control Data Corporation (CDC) engineers on computer architecture and design.  Charles Babbage Institute, University of Minnesota, Minneapolis. Engineers include Robert Moe, Wayne Specker, Dennis Grinna, Tom Rowan, Maurice Hutson, Curt Alexander, Don Pagelkopf, Maris Bergmanis, Dolan Toth, Chuck Hawley, Larry Krueger, Mike Pavlov, Dave Resnick, Howard Krohn, Bill Bhend, Kent Steiner, Raymon Kort, and Neil R. Lincoln.  Discussion topics include CDC 1604, CDC 6600, CDC 7600, CDC 8600, CDC STAR-100 and Seymour Cray.
Information about the spin out of Commercial Credit from Control Data by Sandy Weill
Information about the Control Data CDC 3800 Computer—on display at the National Air and Space Museum Steven F. Udvar-Hazy Center near Washington Dulles International Airport.
Private Collection of historical documents about CDC
Control Data User Manuals Library @ Computing History
Computing history describing the use of a range of CDC systems and equipment 1970–1985
A German collection of CDC, Cray and other large computer systems, some of them in operation

 
American companies established in 1957
American companies disestablished in 1992
Chippewa County, Wisconsin
Computer companies established in 1957
Computer companies disestablished in 1992
Defunct companies based in Minneapolis
Defunct companies based in Minnesota
Defunct computer companies of the United States
Defunct computer hardware companies
Defunct software companies of the United States
Manufacturing companies based in Minnesota
Software companies based in Minnesota
Supercomputers
Technology companies established in 1957
Technology companies disestablished in 1992